Philip Selznick (January 8, 1919 – June 12, 2010) was professor of sociology and law at the University of California, Berkeley. A noted author in organizational theory, sociology of law and public administration, Selznick's work was groundbreaking in several fields in such books as The Moral Commonwealth, TVA and the Grass Roots, and Leadership in Administration.

Career

Selznick earned a bachelor's degree from City College in 1938. He received his PhD in sociology in 1947 from Columbia University. He was on the faculty of the University of California, Berkeley, between 1952 and 1984, initially with the Department of Sociology and later with the School of Law as well.

Major contributions
Selznick was a major proponent of the neo-classical organizational theory movement starting in the 1930s. One of his most influential papers, entitled "Foundations of the Theory of Organization" (1948), laid out his major contributions to organization theory.

Individuals as independent agents
In simplified form, Selznick postulated that individuals within organizations can hold dichotomous goal-sets, which makes it difficult for organizations and employees to have the same implicit, rational objectives (as theorized in classical organization movement which was a precursor of Selznick's work).

Cooptation theory
Selznick's principle of cooptation is an important precursor to the later developments of organizational ecology and contingency theory.

Sociology of law
Selznick has been a major contributor to the sociology of law, developing his ideas on legal institutions and their problems and possibilities of responsiveness to their constituencies, from his earlier work on the sociology of formal organizations.

Theories of mass society

Selznick was first – anticipating Daniel Bell, Edward Shils, Talcott Parsons, William Kornhauser, and a host of American social scientists – to attack the then prevailing theory of mass society. His approach argued instead that there were two analytically distinct theoretical approaches to mass society:
there were those who were critics of equalitarianism or who emphasized the role of creative and culture-bearing elites;
but there were also those who emphasized social disintegration and the quality of participation in mass society and mass organizations.

The first group of theorists is best represented by José Ortega y Gasset and Karl Mannheim. Each of these theorists located the cause of the advent of mass society in the decline of the social position of creative elites who were responsible for the development and the strength of cultural values. Mass society arose when society was no longer directed by an identifiable and stable structure of elites, when the vulgar appetites of the masses supplanted "the canons of refinement and sober restraint." The masses cannot simply take over the role served previously by elites; they can express desires but not values.

The second group of mass society theorists, those who emphasized social disintegration and the quality of participation, was best represented by Emil Lederer, Erich Fromm, and Sigmund Neumann. Selznick argued that these theorists leave the role of elites largely unexamined. They defined mass society as the era of mass man, a type defined not in terms of any relationship to a formally superior or intrinsically more qualified elite, but as the expression of a wider social disintegration. The homogeneous, amorphous, and undifferentiated individuals in the mass resulted from radical social changes which rendered old norms obsolete and old roles meaningless. Psychological deterioration followed on social disorganization: 'as family, church, and traditional political ties weaken, a psychological atomization takes place.' This type of mass society theory pictures society as a crowd in which irrational, emotional acts predominate. "The readiness for manipulation by symbols, especially those permitting sado-masochistic releases, is characteristic of the mass as of the crowd."

Selected publications

References

Further reading
 
 
 Krygier, Martin, Philip Selznick: Ideals in the World. Stanford University Press, 2012.

External links 

1919 births
2010 deaths
Columbia University alumni
University of California, Berkeley faculty
Public administration scholars